The original thirty-minute version of Scooby-Doo and Scrappy-Doo constitutes the fourth incarnation of the Saturday morning cartoon Scooby-Doo. It premiered on September 22, 1979, and ran for one season on ABC as a half-hour program. A total of sixteen episodes were produced. It aired internationally on BBC One in the UK from 1981 to 1984. It was the last Hanna-Barbera cartoon series (excluding prime-time specials) to use the studio's laugh track.

Overview
By 1979, the staff at Hanna-Barbera realized that the Scooby-Doo formula was getting worn out, which gave them reason to parody it in a 1979 primetime special, Scooby Goes Hollywood, which was produced and finished before the series aired in September 1979. In addition, ABC began threatening cancellation for the show, as the show's ratings were declining and Fred Silverman, one of the show's biggest backers at ABC, had left for NBC in 1978. ABC was going to choose between two shows: Scooby-Doo or an unnamed pilot from Ruby Spears Enterprises. Therefore, for its 1979–1980 season, Scooby-Doo was given a major overhaul, adding the character of Scooby's nephew Scrappy-Doo, voiced by Lennie Weinrib, and changing the name of the show to Scooby-Doo and Scrappy-Doo.

Although still present in these episodes, the characters of Fred, Daphne, and Velma became less essential to the plot, and it became more of a concentrated effort to try and make them relevant, once the new character's presence shed light on it. 
  However, they ultimately were removed by the next season.  Shaggy, Scooby and Scrappy were the main focus. Marla Frumkin took over Pat Stevens' role as Velma Dinkley towards the end of the season, beginning with episode 12, "The Ghoul, the Bat, and the Ugly". Velma has only one line; "Have A Good Visit" in episode 16, "The Ransom of Scooby Chief" as she, Fred, and Daphne were not in that episode very much. Like many animated series created by Hanna-Barbera in the 1970s, the show contained a laugh track created by the studio.

Staff
 Directors: Ray Patterson, Carl Urbano, Oscar Dufau, George Gordon
 Story editors: Duane Poole and Tom Swale
 Story: Doug Booth, Diane Duane, Mark Evanier, Willie Gilbert, Glenn Leopold, Duane Poole, Tom Swale, David Villaire

Voice cast

Don Messick – Scooby-Doo
Lennie Weinrib – Scrappy-Doo
Casey Kasem – Norville "Shaggy" Rogers
Heather North – Daphne Blake
Frank Welker – Fred Jones
Pat Stevens – Velma Dinkley (eps. 1–11)
Marla Frumkin – Velma Dinkley (eps. 12–16)

Episodes

Home media
A complete series set was released on April 28, 2015.

References

External links
Scooby-Doo and Scrappy-Doo on The Big Cartoon DataBase

1979 American television series debuts
1980 American television series endings
1970s American mystery television series
1980s American mystery television series
Scooby-Doo television series
American children's animated adventure television series
American children's animated comedy television series
American children's animated fantasy television series
American children's animated horror television series
American children's animated mystery television series
1970s American animated television series
1980s American animated television series
Television series by Hanna-Barbera
American Broadcasting Company original programming
American animated television spin-offs
English-language television shows
Television series created by Joe Ruby
Television series created by Ken Spears